Governor Gilmore may refer to:

Eugene Allen Gilmore (1871–1953), acting Governor-General of the Philippines in 1927 and 1929
Jim Gilmore (born 1949), 68th Governor of Virginia
Joseph A. Gilmore (1811–1867), 29th Governor of New Hampshire

See also
Governor Gilmer (disambiguation)